Academy Theatre is an American drama anthology series that aired on NBC in 1949.  It ran for eight weeks as the summer replacement for Chevrolet on Broadway.

Format
The series utilized a different cast each week who appeared in short works by established playwrights.  The plays were broadcast live in 30-minute segments on Monday nights.

Selected episodes

Development
In April 1949, Charles R. Denny, NBC executive vice-president and a graduate of Amherst College, arranged for a production of Julius Caesar to be broadcast to 14 cities nationwide.  The play was performed by the Amherst College Masquers and directed by F. Curtis Canfield, a professor at Amherst and director of Amherst's Kirby Theatre.  The broadcast marked the first time that an entire play by Shakespeare aired on television.

During the following summer, Canfield (who would later become the first dean of the Yale School of Drama), again collaborated with NBC to bring a series of one-act plays to the network.  Academy Theatre was the result.

During a sabbatical as an NBC producer, Canfield convinced the network to create Masterpiece Playhouse, one-hour productions of seven classic plays including Hedda Gabler, Uncle Vanya, and Othello.  Broadcast in 1950, each play was produced for the "heavy-budget" sum of $10,000.

References

External links

1949 American television series debuts
1949 American television series endings
1940s American anthology television series
American live television series
Black-and-white American television shows
English-language television shows
NBC original programming